The São Paulo Challenger de Tênis is a professional tennis tournament played on outdoor clay courts. It is currently part of the Association of Tennis Professionals (ATP) Challenger Tour. The 2013 event was the first version of the tournament, which also featured a women's competition of the 2013 ITF Women's Circuit.

Past finals

Men's singles

Men's doubles

Women's singles

Women's doubles

External links 
 Official website

 
ATP Challenger Tour
ITF Women's World Tennis Tour
Tennis tournaments in Brazil
Clay court tennis tournaments
Sport in São Paulo
Recurring sporting events established in 2013